Francisco Solis (born 12 January 1999) is a Chilean judoka.

He is the bronze medallist of the 2017 Judo Grand Prix Cancún in the +100 kg category.

References

External links
 

1999 births
Living people
Chilean male judoka
21st-century Chilean people